The 2017–18 Alaska Nanooks men's ice hockey season was the 69th season of play for the program, the 34th at the Division I level and the 5th in the WCHA conference. The Nanooks represented the University of Alaska Fairbanks and were coached by Lance West, in his 1st season.

Season
After the resignation of Dallas Ferguson, long-time assistant coach Lance West was promoted to interim head coach while the school decided who would lead the program.

The team got off to a bit of a slow start, going winless in its first four games. A sweep of arch-rival Alaska Anchorage got the team on the winning side of the ledger entering conference play, however, the Nanooks weren't able to get many wins afterwards. After notching one victory in their next seven matches, the team started showing some jam when they took down #20 Northern Michigan, 4–1. After a second sweep of the Seawolves, Alaska looked to be well positioned when they split with #8 Minnesota State in mid-January, however, goaltending became a problem afterwards. Neither regular starter Anton Martinsson nor backup Niko Della Maggiore were able to keep the keep the puck out of the net on several occasions. Unfortunately, even when they were, the offense usually failed to do much. Alaska went 2–9–1 in their last 11 games and, other than their sweep of Ferris State, Alaska wasn't able to muster much in the way of scoring. To make matters worse, they faced Alaska Anchorage in the regular season finale and were swept at home. The two wins for the Seawolves were half of their total for the year and seemed to take the fight out of the Nanooks.

Alaska just held onto the 8th and final spot for the WCHA Tournament and the team's reward was to face Minnesota State, who had now risen to #3 in the polls. Alaska was trounced in the two games, getting outshot 45–78 and outscored 4–14. After the team's melt-down in the later part of the season, Alaska decided not to retain Lance West and instead turned the team over to his assistant, Erik Largen.

Departures

Recruiting

Roster

Standings

Schedule and results

|-
!colspan=12 style=";" | Exhibition

|-
!colspan=12 style=";" | Regular Season

|-
!colspan=12 style=";" | 

|- align="center" bgcolor="#e0e0e0"
|colspan=12|Alaska Lost Series 0–2

Scoring statistics

Goaltending statistics

Rankings

USCHO did not release a poll in Week 24.

Awards and honors

References

2017-18
Alaska
Alaska
Alaska
Alaska